Grimon Langson (born 10 March 1955) is a former Malawian cyclist. He competed in the individual road race at the 1972 Summer Olympics.

References

External links
 

1955 births
Living people
Malawian male cyclists
Olympic cyclists of Malawi
Cyclists at the 1972 Summer Olympics
Place of birth missing (living people)